NRL South Australia (abbreviated as NRLSA, formerly the South Australian Rugby League) is a not-for-profit organisation responsible for administering the game of rugby league in the state of South Australia. It was formed on 28 July 1976 and is an affiliated state of the Australian Rugby League Commission.

History
In the 1940s the Port Adelaide rugby union club split itself into four rugby league clubs, which formed the basis of the first organised rugby league competition in the state, run under the banner of the Amateur South Australian Rugby League.
The first South Australian representative team was formed in the early 1950s and traveled to play the South Sydney Rabbitohs in Sydney, NSW where they lost 45–10.

The first iteration of the South Australian Rugby League was created in the 1950s when Australian soldiers formed a small four team competition based out of the Woomera Test Range. This body ceased to exist when the soldiers were transferred to the Northern Territory.

The current SARL was incorporated on 28 July 1976 and originally featured teams from Northern Districts, South Adelaide, Port Adelaide, Glenelg, Norwood and West Lakes.

Today the competition features eight senior clubs and seven junior clubs, competitions are run from Under 7's through to First Grade.

Representative football
Representative teams are selected each year to compete in the Australian Secondary Schools Rugby League (ASSRL) National Championships at both 15 and 18 years of age respectively, competing against Western Australia, Victoria, Northern Territory and New South Wales Combined Independent Schools (NSW CIS) at both age levels. Players who compete representing South Australia each year are eligible to be selected into both the Australian Merit Squad and the Australian Affiliated States Merit Squad at the 15 Years championships, and the Australian Schoolboys as well as the Australian Affiliated States team at the 18 Years championships.

A South Australian representative side has played a number of games against international touring sides, including the Australian team.

NRL SA Metro
The NRL SA Metro is the top-level men's competition in South Australia.

Current Clubs

Former Clubs

Premiership history

NRL SAW 
The NRL SAW is the top-level women's competition in South Australia.

Limestone Coast Rugby League

The Limestone Coast Rugby League is a competition co-administered by NRL SA and NRL Victoria.

Clubs

Former Clubs

Former Competitions

Spencer Gulf Rugby League 
NRL SA has previously run competitions in the Spencer Gulf region, but the future of these competitions remains unclear as of 2022.

The Olympic Dam Barbarians based in Roxby Downs have played in various formats including intra club and in the Spencer Gulf competition. There have also been efforts to establish the presence of the game in areas including Coober Pedy, however there remains little competitive Rugby League in Northern SA.

Former Spencer Gulf Rugby League Clubs

Notable SARL juniors competed in the NRL 
The following South Australian junior players have played in the National Rugby League.

Northern Districts Dragons
Nathan Vagg (2 games) – Cronulla Sharks (2003)
South Adelaide Bulldogs
Joel Reddy (137 games) – Parramatta Eels (2005-2011), Wests Tigers (2012-2013), South Sydney Rabbitohs (2014-2016)
Central Districts Roosters
Brenton Lawrence (104 games) – Gold Coast Titans (2011-2012), Manly-Warringah Sea Eagles (2013-2017)

See also

Rugby league in South Australia

References

External links
 
 

Rugby league governing bodies in Australia
Rugby league competitions in Australia
Rugby league in South Australia
Rug
Sports organizations established in 1976